Sohu, Inc. is a Chinese Internet company headquartered in the Sohu Internet Plaza in Haidian District, Beijing. Sohu and its subsidiaries offer advertising, a search engine (Sogou.com), on-line multiplayer gaming (ChangYou.com) and other services.

History
Sohu was founded as Internet Technologies China (ITC) in 1996 by Charles Zhang after he completed his PhD from the Massachusetts Institute of Technology and received venture capital funding from colleagues he met there. The following year, Zhang changed the name of ITC to Sohoo in homage to Yahoo! after meeting its cofounder, Jerry Yang; the name was soon after changed to Sohu to differentiate it from the American company. Sohu has been listed on NASDAQ since 2000 through a variable interest entity (VIE) based in Delaware.

Sohu's Sogou.com search engine was in talks to be sold in July 2013 to Qihoo for around $1.4 billion. On September 17, 2013, it was announced that Tencent has invested $448 million for a minority share in Chinese search engine Sogou.com, the subsidiary of Sohu, Inc.

Sohu was ranked as the world's third- and twelfth-fastest growing company by Fortune in 2009 and 2010, respectively.

Allegations against Google
On April 6, 2007, Sohu made a request that Google stop providing its Google Pinyin Input Method Editor software for download because portions of Sohu's IME software, Sogou Pinyin, were allegedly copied in order to construct it. The detection of the alleged copyright infringement was found due to a suspicious error found in both IMEs, notably the translation of the pinyin "pinggong" which erroneously produces the actor and comedian Feng Gong. On April 9, 2007, Google's spokesman Cui Jin has admitted that the pinyin Google IME "was built leveraging some non-Google database resources."

2008 Olympic Games website
In November 2005, Sohu was selected to be the Official Internet Content Service Sponsor of the Beijing 2008 Olympic Games. Sohu was provided exclusive services to construct, operate and host the official Beijing Olympics website.

References

External links
  

 
Internet technology companies of China
Companies based in Beijing
1996 establishments in China
Internet properties established in 1996
Companies listed on the Nasdaq
Chinese brands
2000 initial public offerings